In the lead-up to the 2018 Fijian general election, many opinion polls were conducted for different newspapers.

Razor Research and Western Force Research opinion polls for the Fiji Sun, while Tebbutt Research conducted polls for The Fiji Times.

Approval ratings

Satisfaction with the government

Preferred Deputy Prime Minister

National

Northern Division

Preferred Prime Minister

Voting intention

References

general election, 2018
2018 elections in Oceania